Crepidotus albescens is a species of saprophytic fungus in the family Crepidotaceae with a stipeless sessile cap.

Description
Crepidotus albescens is distinguished by its remarkably elongate cheilocystidia which is subcylindric to more or less narrowly flask shaped (lageniform). The pileipellis is made up of filamentous, undifferentiated terminal elements.

References

Crepidotaceae
Fungi described in 1984